Ullswater Community College (UCC) is a large mixed comprehensive school in Penrith, Cumbria. It currently has around 1450 students, including about 200 in the sixth form.

The School was formed under the name of Ullswater High School in 1980, when Tynefield (girls) and Ullswater (boys) secondary modern schools merged. The school still has two sets of all facilities (two halls, two gyms, two kitchens) and there is still the 'mixed yard' in the middle of the school.

This was a playground where boys and girls were allowed to 'mix' at breaks. The two main blocks of the school consist of the former schools, now renamed Cumberland block and Westmorland block, named after the historic counties Cumberland and Westmorland that became Cumbria in 1974. Along with Eamont Block for students with learning disabilities, Eden Block, Resources and Rural Science blocks

The character of the school comes from two main factors. The first is its enormous catchment area, one of the largest in England at around 600 square miles. The second is the existence of its neighbour and great rival, Queen Elizabeth Grammar School ('QEGS'). QEGS is a selective school.

Mr David Robinson served as headmaster until April 2004, then the school was led by Mr Stewart Gimber as the head teacher. Ullswater had a ‘good’ inspection in 2006, but in 2009, it was given a ‘notice to improve’ by Ofsted. In September 2009, Mr Nigel Pattinson took over the role as head teacher. Ullswater is a Business and Enterprise College, and has many links with the local community through enterprise projects. The school also had a large adult or further education centre.

In January 2011, construction of a new training centre began, and was completed in September 2011. The new "Applied Learning Centre" was opened on 29 November 2011, by The Duke of Gloucester.

In May 2012, controversy arose as Nigel Pattinson, the headmaster, was given a pay rise at a time when the school was making staff redundant, and was short of money. The governors defended their actions saying that the rise was due to the school meeting the targets that they had set for Mr Pattinson. However, in the Cumberland & Westmorland Herald, one reader pointed out that if Mr Pattinson had met the targets then he had obviously done so with the assistance of other staff.

In March 2016, The Prince of Wales visited the college to look at the work done in applied subjects, such as Construction, Motor Vehicle and Hair and Beauty.

GCSE Results 2012 – Overall, 95.5% of students at the College – which was rated by the Specialist Schools and Academies Trust (SSAT) as ‘most improved secondary school in the North West’ in 2010 – gained five or more A*–C grades, compared with last year’s 92%. Over the last 3 years, the College has improved its results from 54% in 2009 to the current figure of 95.5%.

References 

Secondary schools in Cumbria
Foundation schools in Cumbria
Penrith, Cumbria
Educational institutions established in 1980
1980 establishments in England